Rahim Moazzen-Zadeh Ardabili (1925 – 25 May 2005) was a prominent Muslim Moazzen in Iran. 

He was born in Ardabil Province to a very religious family. His father Abdul Karim Moazzen Zadeh Ardabili was himself the first Moazzen to call azaan. When Sheikh Abdul Karim Moazzen-Zadeh Ardabili called out to prayer (Azan), his voice was broadcast on line by radio. In 1943–1947, he carried out morning program of radio in Imam Mosque in Tehran. In 1947 he died and his son, Rahim Moazenzadeh called out to prayer after him. Rahim Moazenzadeh's famous prayer call (Azan) is in the dastgah of Bayat-e Turk, a musical scale in Azerbaijani traditional music, and it was performed in no: 6 studio of radio station located in 15th Khordad square in 1955. The Azan can still be heard from radio and television. For recording this prayer call, he examined different styles but he accepted none of them. Then he selected Bayat Turk style for his calling prayer, he has always stated: "During the last years, a spiritual pride had been along with me for recording this prayer call, and this spiritual wealth is enough for me". Moazzen-Zadeh Ardabili died on 25 May 2005 in Tehran, at the age of 80.

Adhan feature
Mohammad Reza Shajarian says about Rahim Moazenzadeh's call to Adhan:

References

People from Ardabil
Mu'azzins
Performers of Islamic music
1925 births
2005 deaths